Retouch or retouching may refer to:

Retouch (lithics), the work done to a flint implement after its preliminary roughing-out
Retouch (film), a 2017 Persian-language film
Conservation and restoration of paintings
Photograph manipulation